The discography of Akiko Shikata, a Japanese singer-songwriter and game music composer, consists of a variety of releases. She has released five original vocal albums, three under major labels, and myriad soundtrack releases.

Albums

Studio albums

Compilation albums

Soundtrack albums

Instrumental albums

All instrumental albums have been independently released and did not chart on Oricon albums charts.

Singles

Other appearances

Soundtrack appearances

Miscellaneous appearances

References

Pop music discographies
Discographies of Japanese artists